Grosilliers Lake is a lake in Clearwater County, Minnesota, in the United States.

Grosilliers Lake was named for Médard des Groseilliers, a French explorer, although the spelling is different.

See also
List of lakes in Minnesota

References

Lakes of Minnesota
Lakes of Clearwater County, Minnesota